|}

The Prix Chloé is a Group 3 flat horse race in France open to three-year-old thoroughbred fillies. It is run at Chantilly over a distance of 1,800 metres (about 1⅛ miles), and it is scheduled to take place each year in late June or early July.

History
The event was established in 1921 alongside the Prix Daphnis, a similar contest for colts. The two races were named after the characters Daphnis and Chloe from a work by the Greek novelist Longus. The story was popularised in France by the translation of Paul-Louis Courier. Both races were originally held at Le Tremblay, and they usually took place in late April or early May.

The Prix Chloé was initially contested over 1,600 metres. It served as a trial for the Poule d'Essai des Pouliches.

The distance of the race was extended to 1,800 metres in 1961. Le Tremblay closed in 1967, and the event moved to Longchamp the following year. It was transferred to Évry in 1973, and switched to July in 1977.

The Prix Chloé was cut to 1,600 metres in 1993, and reverted to 1,800 metres in 1994. It remained at Évry until 1996. For periods thereafter it was staged at Maisons-Laffitte (1997, 2006–08), Chantilly (1998–2002, 2004–05) and Longchamp (2003). It was run over 1,600 metres in 2008.

The race returned to Chantilly with a length of 1,800 metres in 2009.

Records
Leading jockey (5 wins):
 Olivier Peslier – Khumba Mela (1998), Acago (2003), Goldikova (2008), Wilside (2009), Beatrice Aurore (2011)

Leading trainer (5 wins):
 Roch Filippi – Finetta (1922), Our Gem (1925), Kantara (1929), Furane (1940), Guirlande (1942)

Leading owner (5 wins):
 Marcel Boussac – Astronomie (1935), Canzoni (1939), Caravelle (1943), Djama (1947), Pareo (1952)

Winners since 1978

 Reine Mathilde finished first in 1984, but she was placed second after a stewards' inquiry.

 Mandesha was first in 2006, but she was relegated to last place following a stewards' inquiry.

Earlier winners

 1921: Durete
 1922: Finetta
 1923: Anna Bolena
 1924: Fleet Cloud
 1925: Our Gem
 1926: Prosty
 1927: Bachelette
 1928: Roahouga
 1929: Kantara
 1930: Carinosa
 1931: Riva Bella
 1932: White Legend
 1933: Arpette
 1934: Mary Tudor
 1935: Astronomie
 1936: Blue Bear
 1937: En Fraude
 1938: Blue Star
 1939: Canzoni
 1940: Furane
 1941: La Barka
 1942: Guirlande
 1943: Caravelle
 1944: La Belle du Canet
 1945: Bluette
 1946: Pastourelle
 1947: Djama
 1948: Lutteuse
 1949: L'Oasis
 1950: Aglae Grace
 1951: Stratonice
 1952: Pareo
 1953: Providence
 1954: La Paix
 1955: Myriade
 1956: Hillsca
 1957: Amabelle
 1958: La Malivoye
 1959: Iadwiga
 1960: Diva
 1961: Belle Shika
 1962: Marmara
 1963: Golden Girl
 1964: Hildegarde
 1965: Cover Girl
 1966: Bubunia
 1967: Modeste
 1968: Felouque
 1969: Glaneuse
 1970: Prime Abord
 1971: Pistol Packer
 1972: La Troublerie
 1973: Servanne
 1974: Rose Bed
 1975: Infra Green
 1976: Rose of Stanbul
 1977: Lillan

See also
 List of French flat horse races

References

 France Galop / Racing Post:

 france-galop.com – A Brief History: Prix Chloé.
 galop.courses-france.com – Prix Chloé – Palmarès depuis 1983.
 galopp-sieger.de – Prix Chloé.
 horseracingintfed.com – International Federation of Horseracing Authorities – Prix Chloé (2016).
 pedigreequery.com – Prix Chloé – Chantilly.

Flat horse races for three-year-old fillies
Chantilly Racecourse
Horse races in France
Recurring sporting events established in 1921